Eagle Plume Mountain is located in the Lewis Range, Glacier National Park in the U.S. state of Montana. Eagle Plume Mountain is connected by a gently sloping ridge to Mad Wolf Mountain to the north.

See also
 Mountains and mountain ranges of Glacier National Park (U.S.)

References

Mountains of Glacier County, Montana
Mountains of Glacier National Park (U.S.)
Lewis Range
Mountains of Montana